Mansfield High School is a public secondary school located at 3001 East Broad Street in Mansfield, Texas. Part of the Mansfield Independent School District, the school serves a portion of Mansfield. As of 2018, the school had 2,688 students. Mansfield High School is known for their baseball and golf sports programs. As well as being the last school district in the country to desegregate, and only doing so when the national guard was brought to escort the first 3 African American students into the building.

Academics 
Mansfield High School has a notable academic presence, as it is the highest performing High School in Mansfield, with a 96% graduation rate as well as having 83% Proficiency in Reading and 85% Proficiency in Mathematics. Mansfield offers 24 AP Courses, ranging from Human Geography to Calculus BC. The average AP Enrollment is 40% and the average Pass Rate is 46%.

Feeder patterns 
The following elementary schools feed into Mansfield High School:

 Boren
 Brown
 Nash (partial)
 Reid
 Tipps

The following intermediate schools feed into Mansfield High School:

 Asa Low (partial)
 Orr (partial)

The following middle schools feed into Mansfield High School:

 Wester (partial)
 Worley (partial)

Notable alumni 
David Graham, perpetrator of the murder of Adrianne Jones
Sam Hilliard, 2012, MLB outfielder for the Colorado Rockies.
Adrianne Jones, murder victim
Lenzy Pipkins, 2012, American football player
Hassan Ridgeway, 2012, American football player
Kenneth Sheets, Republican member of the Texas House of Representatives
Stepfan Taylor, 2009, former NFL running back for the Arizona Cardinals
Trystan Andrew Terrell, perpetrator of the 2019 University of North Carolina at Charlotte shooting
Jordan Walden, 2006, former MLB pitcher
Sean Williams, 2004, professional basketball player
Kennedy Brooks, 2017, Oklahoma Sooners football running back
David Cook, Republican member of the Texas House of Representatives and former mayor of Mansfield.
Charles Ray Hicks, confessed serial killer on Death Row in Pennsylvania. ""Man sentenced to Death Row""

References

External links 
 Mansfield High School
 Mansfield High School Tiger Band

Public high schools in Tarrant County, Texas
Mansfield Independent School District high schools
Mansfield, Texas
1909 establishments in Texas
Educational institutions established in 1909